James "Jimmy" Grehan (born 17 March 1987) is an Australian professional rugby league footballer who has played in the 2010s. 
He will play for Castleford Tigers in 2022 after signing on a 3 year deal.

References

External links
Profile at castigers.com
Grehan set for Cas bow
Tigers add Grehan
 (archived by web.archive.org) Tigers snare Australian centre James Grehan
Tigers add depth to squad with Grehan
Video – Chubbs' Catch Cup – Jimmy Grehan
 (archived by web.archive.org) Statistics at thecastlefordtigers.co.uk
Search for "James Grehan" at bbc.co.uk

1987 births
Living people
Australian rugby league players
Batley Bulldogs players
Castleford Tigers players
Limoux Grizzlies players
Place of birth missing (living people)
Rugby league centres
Rugby league locks
Rugby league second-rows